Hans Fredrik Lennart Neij (born 27 April 1978), alias TiAMO, is the co-founder of The Pirate Bay, and the Swedish Internet service provider and web hosting company PRQ. Neij was one of the defendants in The Pirate Bay Trial which began on 16 February 2009. He and other operators of The Pirate Bay were charged with assisting users in copyright infringing practices. His time during the aforementioned trial has been captured in the documentary film TPB AFK by Simon Klose.

Legal issues 

On 17 April 2009, Neij was found guilty. He was sentenced to one year in prison and ordered to pay damages of $905,000.

In November 2014, Neij was arrested in Nong Khai on an Interpol warrant while attempting to cross the border from Laos to Thailand. Thai authorities stated that a US-based film association had a Thai lawyer search for Neij and aid in his capture. During his three years in Laos, he had reportedly crossed the border almost 30 times into Thailand, where he had a home on the resort island of Phuket. BayFiles, a Pirate Bay-affiliated file hosting website registered under Neij's name, was abruptly shut down after the arrest.

Neij served two-thirds (200 days) of a 10-month sentence in Skänninge Prison in central Sweden. He was released on 1 June 2015 and is planning to settle in Laos and work in IT.

References

External links 

1978 births
The Pirate Bay
Living people
Place of birth missing (living people)
Intellectual property activism
Copyright activists